Gerald Edwind Fitch (born August 12, 1982) is an American professional basketball player for Regatas Corrientes of the Liga Nacional de Básquet. He played college basketball at the University of Kentucky and has played internationally and in the National Basketball Association.

College career
Fitch came to Kentucky in 2000 after being named Mr. Basketball in the state of Georgia his senior year at Westside High School in Macon, Georgia. Fitch entered the starting lineup early in his freshman year, and was named to the All-SEC Freshman Team. Fitch had a successful four years at Kentucky, leading the team to records of 32–4 and 27–5 in his junior and senior years, respectively. His college career ended, however, with a missed shot at the buzzer to seal an upset loss to UAB in the second round of the 2004 NCAA Tournament.

Professional career
After going undrafted in the 2004 NBA draft, Fitch signed with the Washington Wizards prior to the 2004–05 season. He received playing time in the preseason, but was cut prior to the start of the regular season. Fitch then spent that season playing overseas in the Euroleague and the Ukrainian SuperLeague.

Prior to the 2005–06 season, Fitch signed with the Miami Heat, where he was used as third string point guard behind Jason Williams and Gary Payton. At the trade deadline on February 23, 2006, he was shipped to the Houston Rockets in exchange for Derek Anderson, and waived before ever playing a game for them.

On March 7, 2006, Fitch was assigned to the Austin Toros of the NBA Development League. The following season, he played for Turkish team  Galatasaray Café Crown.

On October 1, 2007, the Detroit Pistons signed Fitch via free agency, but he was eventually released during preseason.

At the end of 2007, he was signed by Pallacanestro Cantù.

On January 25, 2011, he signed with Unicaja Málaga in Spain until the end of 2011–12 season.

For the 2013–14 season he signed with the Foshan Long Lions of the Chinese Basketball Association.

In March 2014, he signed with Mersin BB of Turkey for the rest of the season.

On February 7, 2016, he signed with the Piratas de Quebradillas of the Baloncesto Superior Nacional.

On January 12, 2017, he signed with San Lorenzo de Almagro of the Liga Nacional de Básquet.

On March 14, 2017, he re-joined the Piratas de Quebradillas for the 2017 BSN season.

On January 28, 2018, he signed with Regatas Corrientes.

References

External links
Euroleague.net profile
NBA.com biography
Career UK stats
DraftExpress.com profile
basketball-reference.com profile
ACB.com profile
TBLStat.net profile
FIBA.com profile
Eurobasket.com profile

1982 births
Living people
African-American basketball players
Aliağa Petkim basketball players
American expatriate basketball people in Argentina
American expatriate basketball people in China
American expatriate basketball people in Croatia
American expatriate basketball people in France
American expatriate basketball people in Italy
American expatriate basketball people in Spain
American expatriate basketball people in Turkey
American expatriate basketball people in Ukraine
American expatriate basketball people in Venezuela
American men's basketball players
Austin Toros players
Baloncesto Fuenlabrada players
Basketball players from Columbus, Georgia
Baloncesto Málaga players
BC Khimik players
Guangzhou Loong Lions players
Galatasaray S.K. (men's basketball) players
Kentucky Wildcats men's basketball players
Kepez Belediyesi S.K. players
KK Cibona players
Liga ACB players
Mersin Büyükşehir Belediyesi S.K. players
Miami Heat players
Pallacanestro Cantù players
Piratas de Quebradillas players
Point guards
SIG Basket players
Undrafted National Basketball Association players
21st-century African-American sportspeople
20th-century African-American people